Odalis Revé Jiménez (born January 15, 1970 in Holguín) is a retired Cuban judoka. At the 1992 Summer Olympics she won the gold medal in the Women's Middleweight (– 66 kg) category.

References
Profile
radiorebelde

1970 births
Living people
Judoka at the 1992 Summer Olympics
Judoka at the 1996 Summer Olympics
Judoka at the 1991 Pan American Games
Judoka at the 1995 Pan American Games
Olympic judoka of Cuba
Olympic gold medalists for Cuba
Olympic medalists in judo
Cuban female judoka
Medalists at the 1992 Summer Olympics
Pan American Games gold medalists for Cuba
Pan American Games medalists in judo
Medalists at the 1991 Pan American Games
People from Holguín
20th-century Cuban women
21st-century Cuban women